Rockin' Roll Baby is the third studio album recorded by American R&B group The Stylistics, released in November 1973 on the Avco label. It was produced by Thom Bell and recorded at Sigma Sound Studio North in Philadelphia. This was the group's last album produced by Bell.

Background

While on Avco, they began working with producer/songwriter Thom Bell, and along with songwriter Linda Creed created a bunch of hit singles that used lavish production backing the lead vocals of Russell Thompkins, Jr. Every single that Bell produced was a hit. The album includes the original full version of the song, "You Make Me Feel Brand New".

Chart performance
The album reached No. 66 on the Billboard LPs chart and No. 5 on the R&B albums chart. The title track reached No. 14 on the Billboard Hot 100, No. 3 on the R&B singles chart, and No. 6 on the UK Singles Chart.

Track listing

Personnel
Russell Thompkins, Jr. – lead vocals, backing vocals
Airrion Love – backing vocals, lead vocals on "You Make Me Feel Brand New"
James Smith, Herb Murrell, James Dunn – backing vocals
Linda Creed, Barbara Ingram, Evette Benton, Carla Benson – additional backing vocals
Norman Harris, Bobby Eli – guitar
Ronnie Baker – bass
Earl Young – drums
Larry Washington – timbales, congas, bongos
Vince Montana – percussion
Thom Bell – keyboards
Joseph DeAngelis, Milton Fipps – French horn
Jack Faith – alto saxophone, flute
John Davis – tenor saxophone, baritone saxophone
Bobby Hartzell, Rocco Bene – trumpet, flugelhorn, piccolo trumpet
Freddy Joiner, Bobby Moore – tenor trombone
Richard Genevese – bass trombone
Walter File – harp
Don Renaldo and His Swinging Strings – strings

Charts

Singles

References

External links
 

1973 albums
The Stylistics albums
Albums produced by Thom Bell
Albums arranged by Thom Bell
Albums recorded at Sigma Sound Studios
Avco Records albums